The term phoenix club is used in professional team sports to refer to a new entity that is set up to replace that of a club that has failed in business terms but not in sporting terms, and generally involves the continuation of the sporting activity. In some cases, the phoenix club is created by the supporters of the club which has ended, or seems to be on the point of ending.  A phoenix club will often have a very similar (although, for legal reasons, not identical) name and logo to the original club, and will also use a similar playing kit. The term is particularly prevalent in the United Kingdom and Italy in relation to association football, although it is also used in other countries.

The term has also been used to refer to a club formed by supporters of a major team when a change of ownership or policy causes them to lose faith in the management of their favoured side. This happened in 2005, when F.C. United of Manchester was formed by some fans of Manchester United, specifically as a protest at the sale of the latter to Malcolm Glazer, and at what they saw as the excessive and unacceptable commercialisation of the club, although the new club's status as a phoenix is open to dispute on the basis that the original club still exists.

The term is derived from the mythical phoenix, a bird which was said to resurrect itself from its own ashes. In at least one case, the name of a phoenix club has played on the term itself: in the Australia-New Zealand A-League, now known as A-League Men, the defunct New Zealand Knights were replaced by new club Wellington Phoenix FC.

In some cases, phoenix clubs retain the name of the club which they replaced, implying a continuation from the former team. In other cases, name changes occur, perhaps due to proprietorial ownership of the old club's name. An American football example is the Cleveland Browns, the original franchise of which moved to Baltimore in 1995 to become the Baltimore Ravens. However, the NFL stipulated that, as part of the move, the franchise would not be able to keep the history and records of the Browns, a cornerstone NFL franchise.  In 1999, the "new" Browns were granted an expansion franchise and were awarded all of the former team's history by the league, even though the extant Ravens had the original Browns players and personnel.  The league and club view the Browns as one single team with a sporting hiatus.

The term does not include teams that have relocated as a going concern, and/or have been renamed. Many of the former may list their founding date as the day they moved, but they are considered to be the same club and therefore cannot be seen as a phoenix, unless their previous entity has officially folded.

However, because there is no single, universally-accepted definition, ascribing the term phoenix club can be disputed depending on the criteria used. Furthermore, there may be changes in what each country's football governing body and legal system defines as a phoenix club rather than resurrected club.

Association football

Austria

Belgium

Brazil

a AA Cabofriense was refounded as AD Cabofriense in 1997 by the same directors with the aim of separating football from the social club activities.
b Due to financial problems, Operário Várzea-Grandense (also known as CEOV) withdrew from professional football in 1996. As it is one of the clubs with the most fans in the state, EC Operário was created with the same colors (red and green) as the traditional CEOV. Despite being state champion twice (1997 and 2002), the club did not receive the expected support and closed its activities in 2002. Another club with a similar name was created (Operário Futebol Ltda.), this time with red and black colors in honor of CR Flamengo, and has won the 2006 tournament. Operário Ltda. currently competes in the second division and the original CEOV returned to professional football in 2013.
c The original Taguatinga EC and CA Taguatinga (former CA Bandeirante) merged in 2018.
d Former SC Atibaia.

Bulgaria

Canada

Czech Republic

Costa Rica

a A.D. Generaleña merged with A.D. Pérez Zeledón to become Municipal Pérez Zeledón, de facto only continuing the Pérez Zeledón heritage.

Croatia

a The finances of the original NK Varaždin (called NK Varteks from 1958 to 2010) stumbled repeatedly for five years. When this led to their suspension in 2011, an unassociated NK Varteks was created. When they were suspended again in 2012, a new unassociated Varaždin emerged. The original club, including its records and history, folded in 2015.

England / Wales

a Wimbledon F.C. became Milton Keynes Dons F.C. in 2004, two years after the foundation of AFC Wimbledon; see Relocation of Wimbledon F.C. to Milton Keynes.

Finland

France

Germany

Indonesia

Italy

In the early 21st century, numerous Italian clubs endured very severe economic problems, including some famous and historically successful teams. Some, most notably Fiorentina, Napoli, Parma and Torino were each declared formally bankrupt and thus had to reapply to the Italian football authorities to play at a lower level, with new owners and as new corporate entities. However, all are considered to be the same clubs before and after the bankruptcy rather than separate phoenix entities; They obtained the "sports title" to remain in the Italy football pyramid using clauses in the Article 52 of N.O.I.F.

Japan

Korea

Latvia

Lithuania

aFollowing a court settlement in 2014, club acquired rights to the history, titles, name and other assets of the original club.

North Macedonia

Northern Ireland

Peru

Poland

Portugal

Republic of Ireland

Romania

Russia

Scotland

b Airdrieonians F.C. (1878) were liquidated in 2002 but their owners bought Clydebank and rebranded it as Airdrie United (now known as Airdrieonians F.C. (2002)); therefore that club is not a phoenix as it took the place of an existing entity. However the current incarnation of Clydebank is a phoenix, as it was founded by supporters to replace the entity which had moved to Airdrie and had to restart at the bottom of the (Junior) league pyramid. Unlike…

During the liquidation of The Rangers Football Club plc in 2012, a new company, set up for the purpose, bought the assets of the business and secured the transfer of its SFA membership, which allowed Rangers F.C. to continue playing, albeit having to start again in the lowest national division of the Scottish football league system.

Serbia

Slovakia

Slovenia

Spain

Ukraine 

 Notes:
 Due to World War I and World War II, technically all of the clubs that competed before those wars were recreated from scratched in order to continue yet for many clubs of the Soviet part of Ukraine immediate their revival upon hostilities conditionally is considered as continuation of business. Due to recent renewed hostilities by the Russian Federation, many clubs were forced to suspend their business operations indefinitely.
 While perceived as phoenix club of FC Dnipro, officially SC Dnipro-1 is considered to be a totally new club according to the FIFA rulings as the club did not clear its debts and refused to acknowledge them.
 Polish club of Pogon Lwow was reestablished in Ukraine by local Polish diaspora based on Pogon Lwow of the interbellum Poland. The club competes at regional level.
 Technically split between Metal Kharkiv and Metalist 1925 Kharkiv, in 2020 the Ukrainian Association of Football officially acknowledge heritage of the original club after Metal Kharkiv.

United States

Baseball

United States

Basketball

Poland

United Kingdom

Ice hockey

Canada

England

Sweden

United States

Notes

References

Association football terminology
Sports clubs

Sports terminology